For information about the Maldivian people as a whole, see Demographics of the Maldives and Culture of the Maldives.

Maldivians are persons from the Maldives, or of Maldivian descent.  Below is a list of notable Maldivians:

General people
 Muhammad Thakurufaanu Al Auzam
 Mohamed Zahir Hussain
 Ilyas Hussain Ibrahim
 Moosa Ali Jaleel
 Imad Latheef
 Jennifer Latheef
 Ahmed Shafeeq Ibrahim Moosa
 Mohamed Munavvar
 Hassan Evan Naseem
 Hassan Saeed
 Sultan Saeed
 Husain Salaahuddin
 Fathimath Shafeega
 Mohamed bin Hajj Ali Thukkala
 Hassan Ugail
 Naushad Waheed
 Mohamed Zahir

Military personnel
 Major General Abdulla Shamaal

Computer scientists
 Hassan Ugail

Lawyers
 Mohamed Munavvar
 Hassan Saeed

Mathematicians
 Hassan Ugail

Extrajudicial prisoners of the United States
 Ibrahim Fauzee

Royal families
 Dhiyamigili dynasty
 Hilaalee dynasty
 Huraa dynasty
 Isdhoo dynasty
 House of Theemuge
 Utheemu dynasty

Maldivians
 
Maldivians
Maldivians